Colonius is the Cologne telecommunications tower, which was finished in 1981. The Colonius possesses a cafeteria, viewing platform, and a restaurant, apart from antennas for radio relay and radio services within the VHF range. Because of a missing leaseholder, the visitor's area including restaurant and viewing platform has been closed since 1992. At the time of its completion the Colonius was 252.9 meters high.  In 2004 a radio tower added by helicopter increased the height to 266 meters. This addition allowed the broadcast of digital television (DVB-T)  from the tower in the Cologne/Bonn region.

External links
 

Towers completed in 1981
Observation towers in North Rhine-Westphalia
Communication towers in Germany
Tourist attractions in Cologne
Buildings and structures in Cologne
Restaurant towers
1981 establishments in West Germany